The National Emblem of the Republic of Korea (Hanja:) consists of the taegeuk symbol present on the South Korean national flag surrounded by five stylized petals and a ribbon bearing the inscription of the official Korean name of the country  (Daehan Minguk), in Korean characters. The Taegeuk represents peace and harmony. The five petals all have meaning and are related to South Korea's national flower, the Hibiscus syriacus, or Rose of Sharon (Hanja: 無窮花, mugunghwa). 

The emblem was adopted on 10 December 1963. The flower and taegeuk symbols are generally considered by South Koreans to be symbolic of the "Korean race".

Gallery

See also

Flag of South Korea
Emblem of North Korea
Imperial Seal of Korea, uses plum blossom instead
Taegeuk

References

External links
Office of the President
Office of the Prime Minister 
Korea.net 

National symbols of South Korea
Korea, South
Korean heraldry